Marko Avramović (born 2 April 1987) is a Serbian football midfielder who last played for Sloboda Užice in Serbian First League.

Honours
Mladost Lučani
 Serbian First League: 2013–14

References

External links
 

1987 births
Living people
People from Lučani
Association football midfielders
Serbian footballers
FK Mladost Lučani players
FK Jagodina players
FK Banat Zrenjanin players
FK Sloboda Užice players
Serbian SuperLiga players